The Anderson Trojans are the athletic sports teams for Anderson University, located in Anderson, South Carolina, in NCAA Division II intercollegiate sports. The Trojans compete as members of the South Atlantic Conference.

Varsity sports
Anderson announced the addition of college football starting in the 2024 season.

Teams

Men's sports
 Baseball
 Basketball
 Cross Country
 Golf
 Lacrosse
 Soccer
 Tennis
 Track & Field

Women's sports
 Basketball
 Cross Country
 Golf
 Lacrosse
 Soccer
 Softball
 Tennis
 Track & Field
 Volleyball

Championships

NCAA

Individual
Anderson has had one Trojan win an NCAA individual championship at the Division II level.
Men's wrestling (1): 2005 (Careef Robertson, 174)

Other 
The Trojans have won five national championships that were not bestowed by the NCAA:
Women's basketball (4): 1974, 1975, 1976, 1977 (AIAW Junior/Community College)
Baseball (1): 1994 (NCCAA)

References

External links